Raritan Center is a business park located in Edison, New Jersey. 
Sited on part of the former Raritan Arsenal, the Raritan Center Business Park is a  logistics center with office buildings and millions of square feet of light manufacturing or distribution. It provides services for transload, cross-dock, warehousing and “3PL” service providers operations. 

It is home to regional distribution facilities for organizations including Federal Express, CertainTeed, Arizona Beverage Company, United Parcel Service, among others.  The newsroom of News 12 New Jersey and the New Jersey Convention & Expo Center are located at the center.

References

Buildings and structures in Middlesex County, New Jersey
Economy of New Jersey
Business parks of the United States
Neighborhoods in Edison, New Jersey
Port of New York and New Jersey